{{DISPLAYTITLE:C24H31NO4}}

The molecular formula C24H31NO4 (molar mass: 397.50 g/mol) may refer to:
 Diethylamino hydroxybenzoyl hexyl benzoate, an organic compound used in sunscreens
 Drotaverine, an antispasmodic drug